Tozoztontli is the name of the third month of the Aztec calendar. It means  Little Perforation. It is also a festival  in the Aztec religion, the deities are Centeotl, Tlaloque, Chicomecoatl and Coatlicue. It marks the end of the dry season. It is the season of bird sacrifices and is called The Little Vigil.

References

Aztec calendars
Aztec mythology and religion